Skrino is a village in the municipality of Boboshevo, Kyustendil Province, western Bulgaria. As of 2013 it has 66 inhabitants.

Geography 

The village is located in the Ruen mountain, the northernmost part of the Vlahina mountain range.

History 

Skrino is known under the same name since the 9th century, when it was part of the Bulgarian Empire. It is believed to have been the birthplace of Saint John of Rila, the patron of the Bulgarian people. The Ruen Monastery is situated nearby.

Famous people 
 Saint John of Rila (c. 878–946)

Honour 
Skrino Rocks in the South Shetland Islands, Antarctica are named after the village.

Citations 

Villages in Kyustendil Province